This list of the prehistoric life of Mississippi contains the various prehistoric life-forms whose fossilized remains have been reported from within the US state of Mississippi.

Precambrian-Paleozoic
The Paleobiology Database records no known occurrences of Precambrian or Paleozoic fossils in Mississippi.

Mesozoic

 Acesta
 Acirsa
 Acmaea
  †Acteon
 †Aenona
 †Agerostrea
 Alvania
 †Ampullina
 Anatina
 †Ancilla
 †Anomia
 †Anomoeodus
 †Arca
 Architectonica
 Arrhoges
 Astarte
  Atractosteus
  †Baculites
 †Baculites arculus
 †Baculites capensis
 †Baculites grandis – or unidentified comparable form
 †Baculites tippahensis
 Barbatia
 †Belemnitella
 †Belemnitella americana
 Bernaya
  Bittium – tentative report
 Botula
 †Botula carolinensis
 †Botula ripleyana
 Brachidontes
 Bulla – tentative report
 Cadulus
 Caestocorbula
 †Caestocorbula crassaplica
 †Caestocorbula crassiplica
 †Caestocorbula suffalciata
 †Caestocorbula terramaria
 †Calliomphalus
 †Calliomphalus americanus
 †Calliomphalus nudus
 Calyptraea
 Cantharus
  Capulus
  Carcharias – tentative report
 Caryophyllia
 †Catopygus
 †Caveola
 Ceratia
 Cerithiella
 †Cerithiella nodoliratum
 †Cerithiella semirugatum
 Cerithium
 Chlamys
 †Chondrites
  Cidaris
 Clavagella
 Cliona
 Corbula
 Crenella
 †Crenella elegantula
 †Crenella serica
  †Cretolamna
 †Cretolamna appendiculata
 Crucibulum
  Cucullaea
 †Cucullaea capax
 †Cucullaea littlei
 Cuspidaria
 †Cuspidaria grandis
 †Cuspidaria jerseyensis – or unidentified comparable form
 Cylichna
 †Cylichna diversilirata
 †Cylichna incisa
 †Cymella
 Dasmosmilia
 †Dasmosmilia kochii
  †Dentalium
 †Dentalium leve
 Dimya
 †Discoscaphites
 †Discoscaphites conradi
 †Discoscaphites iris
 †Dolicholatirus
 †Ecphora
  †Enchodus
 †Enchodus petrosus
 †Eothoracosaurus – type locality for genus
 †Eothoracosaurus mississippiensis – type locality for species
 †Epitonium
 †Epitonium sillimani
  †Eryma – report made of unidentified related form or using admittedly obsolete nomenclature
 †Eulima
 †Eulima gracilistylis
 †Eulima monmouthensis
 †Euspira
 †Eutrephoceras
  †Exogyra
 †Exogyra costata
 †Exogyra ponderosa
 †Exogyra upatoiensis
 Fusinus
 †Gegania
 Gemmula
 †Gervillia
 Ginglymostoma
 Glossus
 Glycymeris
 †Glycymeris rotundata
  †Gryphaea
 †Gyrineum
 †Hadrosaurus – tentative report
 †Hamites
 †Hamulus
 †Helicoceras
 Hemiscyllium
  †Hoploparia
 Hyala
 †Hybodus
  †Inoceramus
 †Ischyrhiza
 †Ischyrhiza mira
 Lepisosteus
 Lima
 Limatula
 †Linearis
 †Linthia
 Linuparus
 Lithophaga
  Lopha
 †Lopha falcata
 †Lopha mesenterica
 †Lucina – tentative report
 †Mathilda
 Meretrix – tentative report
 †Micraster
 Modiolus
 †Modiolus sedesclaris
 †Modiolus sedesclarus
 †Morea
  †Mosasaurus
 †Mytilus – tentative report
 †Neithea
 †Neithea bexarensis
 Nerita
 Neritina
  †Nostoceras
 Nozeba
 Nucula
 †Nucula camia
 †Nucula cuneifrons
 †Nucula percrassa
  Ostrea
  †Pachydiscus
 †Pachymelania – tentative report
 Panopea
 †Paranomia
 Pecten
 Pholadomya
 †Pholadomya occidentalis
 Pinna
 †Placenticeras
 †Plagiostoma
  †Platecarpus – type locality for genus
 †Platecarpus tympaniticus – type locality for species
 †Plesiotriton
 Plicatula
 Polinices
 †Protocardia
  †Pseudocorax
 †Pteria
 †Pterotrigonia
 †Pterotrigonia angulicostata
 †Pterotrigonia eufalensis
 †Pterotrigonia eufaulensis
 †Pterotrigonia thoracica
  †Ptychodus
 †Ptychodus mortoni
 †Ptychotrygon
 Pycnodonte
 †Pycnodonte belli
 †Pycnodonte mutabilis
 †Pycnodonte vesicularis
 Ringicula
 †Ringicula clarki
 †Ringicula pulchella
 †Sargana
 †Sassia
  †Scapanorhynchus
 †Scapanorhynchus texanus
 †Scaphites
 †Scaphites leei
 †Sclerorhynchus
 Seila
 Serpula
  †Sphenodiscus
 †Sphenodiscus beecheri
 †Sphenodiscus lobatus
 †Sphenodiscus pleurisepta
 Spondylus
 Squalicorax
 †Squalicorax kaupi
 Stosicia
 Teinostoma
 Tellina
 †Tenea
 Thracia
 †Tornus – tentative report
  Trachycardium
 †Trachycardium eufaulensis
 Trichotropis
 †Trigonia
 †Trigonostoma
 †Turrilites
 Turritella
 †Turritella bilira
 †Turritella chalybeatensis
 †Turritella hilgardi
 †Turritella paravertebroides
 †Turritella tippana
 †Turritella trilira
 †Turritella vertebroides
 †Tympanotonus
  †Xiphactinus
 †Xiphactinus audax

Cenozoic

 Abra
  Acanthocardia
 Acar
 Acirsa – tentative report
 Aclis
 †Acra
 Acteocina
 Acteon
 Aequipecten
 Aetobatus
 Agaronia
 Agatrix
 Alaba
 Alabina
 Albula
 Alligator
  †Alligator mississippiensis
 †Altrix
 Americardia
 Ammonia
 †Amonia
 Anadara
 Ancilla
 Anodontia
 Anomia
 †Anomotodon
 Antalis
 Apiotoma
  Aporrhais
 †Arbia
 †Archaeomanta
 Architectonica
 Arene
 Arius
 Astarte
 Asthenotoma
 Astrangia
  Athleta
 Atrina
 †Aturia
 Atys
 Axelella
 Balanophyllia
 †Baluchicardia
 Barbatia
  †Basilosaurus
 †Basilosaurus cetoides
 Bathytoma
 †Belosaepia
  Bison
 Bittium
 †Bonellitia
 Bos
 Brachidontes
 Bregmaceros
 †Brychaetus
 Bulla
 Bullia
 †Burnhamia
 Busycon
 Cadulus
 Caecum
 Caestocorbula
 Callianassa
  Calliostoma
 Callista
 Calotrophon
 †Calotrophon ostrearum
 Calyptraea
 Cantharus
 Capulus
 Carcharhinus
 Carcharias
  Carcharodon
 Cassis
 Cerithiella
 Cervus
 Chama
 Chamelea
 Chaoborus
  Chelonibia
 Chicoreus
 Chione
 Chiton
 Chlamys
 Circulus
 Cirsotrema
 Clathurella
 Clava
 Clavilithes
 Clio
 Closia
 Clypeaster
 Cochlespira
  Codakia
 Columbellopsis
 Conger
 Conomitra
 †Conorbis
 Conus
 Coralliophila
 Corbula
 Cordieria
 †Corvina
  †Coryphodon
 †Coupatezia
 Crassispira
 Crassostrea
 Crenella
 Crepidula
  †Cretolamna
 Crisia
 †Crommium
 Cuna – tentative report
 Cuspidaria
 Cylichna
 †Cylindracanthus
 Cymatium
 Cymatosyrinx
 Cymia
  †Cynthiacetus – type locality for genus
 Cypraea
 Cypraedia
 Daphnella
 Dasyatis
 Dendrophyllia
 Dentalium
 Dermomurex
  †Diacodexis
 Dimya
 Dinocardium
 Diodon
 Diodora
 Discopsis
 Distorsio
 †Dolicholatirus
 Donax
  †Dorudon
  †Ectocion
 †Egertonia
 Elphidium
 Emydoidea
 †Emydoidea blandingii
 Enaeta
 †Eosurcula
 Epitonium
 Equus
 Ervilia
 Erycina
 Eulima
 Eulimella
 Eumetula
 Eunaticina
 †Eunicella
 Euspira
 †Exilia
 †Fedora
 †Ficopsis
  Ficus
 Flabellum
 Fulgurofusus
 Fusinus
 Fustiaria
  Galeocerdo
 Galeodea
 Galeorhinus
 Galeus
 Gari
 Gastrochaena
 Gegania
 Gemmula
 Genota
 Geochelone
  †Georgiacetus
 †Georgiacetus vogtlensis
 †Gigantostrea
 Ginglymostoma
 Globigerina
 Globularia
 Glycymeris
 Glyptemys
 †Glyptemys insculpta
 Glyptoactis
 †Gracilocyon
 Graptemys
 Harpa
 †Harpactocarcinus
 Hastula
 Haustator
  †Hemiauchenia
 †Hemiauchenia macrocephala
 Hemipristis
 †Hemisurcula
 †Hesperotestudo
 Heterodontus
 Hexaplex
 Hipponix
 Homo
  †Hyracotherium
 Isurus
 †Jefitchia
 Kellia
 Kuphus
 Laevicardium
 Lamna
 Latirus
 Lepisosteus
 Lima
 Limacina
  Limaria
 Linga
 Litiopa
 Lopha
 Lophius
 Lucina
 Lunularia
 Lyria
 Macrocallista
 Mactra
 †Mammut
  †Mammut americanum
 Maretia
 Margaretta
 Marginella
 †Mastigophora
 Mathilda – tentative report
 Mathilda
  †Megalonyx
 †Megalonyx jeffersonii
 Melanella
 Mesalia
  †Metamynodon
 †Metamynodon planifrons
 Metula
 †Miacis
 †Michela
 Microdrillia
 †Mimoperadectes
 Mitra
 Mitrella
 Modiolus – tentative report
 Mulinia
 †Mulinia lateralis
 Murex
 Murexiella
 Mustelus
 Myliobatis
  †Mylodon
  †Nannippus
 Nassarius
 †Natchitochia
 Natica
 Naticarius
 Nebrius
 Neverita
 Niso
 Norrisia
 †Notiotitanops – type locality for genus
 Nucula
 Oculina
 Odontaspis
 Odostomia
 Oliva
 †Ophiomorpha
 Ostrea
  †Otodus
 †Oxyrhina
 †Pachecoa
  †Palaeophis
 †Palaeosinopa
 Panopea
 Panthera
 †Panthera leo
 †Paramys
 Pecten
 Penion
  †Peratherium
 Petaloconchus
 Phalium
 Philine
 Pholadomya
 Pholas
 Phos
 Phyllodus
 Phyllonotus
 †Physogaleus
 Pitar
  Platyrhina
 Pleurofusia
 †Pleurofusia fluctuosa
 †Pleurofusia longirostropsis
 Pleuromeris
 †Pleurostoma
 Plicatula
 Poirieria
 Polinices
 Polyschides
 Porella
 †Potamides
  Pristis
 Prunum
 †Pseudolatirus
 Pseudoliva
 Pteria
 †Pterochelus
 Pterynotus
 Puncturella
 Pycnodonte
  Pycnodus
 Pyramidella
 Rangia
 Raphitoma
  Reteporella
 Retusa
 Rhinobatos
 Rhinoptera
 Rhynchoconger
 Rictaxis
 Ringicula
 Rissoina
 Sassia
  Scaphander
 Scapharca
 Scaphella – or unidentified comparable form
 Schizaster
 Sconsia
 Scyliorhinus
 Seila
 Semele
  Semicassis
 †Seraphs
 Serpulorbis
 Sigatica
 †Sinistrella
 Sinum
 Siphonalia
 Siphonochelus
 Skena
 Solariella
 Solecurtus
 Sphyraena – tentative report
 Spisula
 Spondylus
 †Striatolamia
 Strioterebrum
 Strombiformis
  †Subhyracodon
 Sveltella
 Syntomodrillia
 †Syntomodrillia tantula
  †Teilhardina
 †Teilhardina magnoliana
 Teinostoma
 Tellina
 Tenagodus
 Terebra
 Teredo
 Terrapene
 †Terrapene carolina
 Thracia
 Tornus
  Trachycardium
 Trigonostoma
 †Trinacria
 Triphora
 Trochita
 †Trygon
 Turbonilla
 †Turbonilla major
 Turricula
 Turris – report made of unidentified related form or using admittedly obsolete nomenclature
 Turritella
 Typhina
 Typhis
 †Uintacyon
 Umbraculum
 †Unitas
 Urosalpinx
 Ursus
  †Ursus americanus
 †Vassacyon
 Vasum
 Venericardia
 Venus – report made of unidentified related form or using admittedly obsolete nomenclature
 Verticordia
 Vexillum
 Vitrinella
 †Viverravus
  Volema
 Xenophora
 †Xiphiorhynchus
 Xylophaga – tentative report
 Yoldia
  †Zygorhiza
 †Zygorhiza kochii

References
 

Mississippi
Mississippi-related lists